Benedict McCarthy is a former South African footballer who represented his country 79 times and scored 31 goals between 1997 and 2012. He played as a forward during the course of his career and is the top scorer in the history of the national team, having broken Shaun Bartlett's previous record of 29 international goals in a friendly win over Paraguay in March 2008.

Having previously represented South Africa at under-23 level, McCarthy made his senior debut on 4 June 1997 against the Netherlands. He scored his first international goals on 16 February 1998, scoring four times in 13 minutes against Namibia at the 1998 African Cup of Nations. He added another goal against Morocco and scored twice more against the Democratic Republic of Congo to lead South Africa to the final. Though the nation were ultimately beaten by Egypt, McCarthy was named Player of the Tournament, and collected the Top Scorer award for his seven goals. Later that year, at the 1998 FIFA World Cup in France, he scored South Africa's first ever goal at a World Cup finals, netting the equaliser in a 1–1 draw with Denmark that saw the nation earn a point at the competition for the first time. Adding three friendly goals against Iceland and Egypt, McCarthy ended with 11 goals to his name for the year.

He temporarily retired from international football in 1999 following club-versus-country conflicts and missed the 2000 African Cup of Nations as a result. Two years later, he scored at the 2002 FIFA World Cup in a 3–2 loss to Spain.

On 9 September 2007, McCarthy equalled Bartlett's national record when he scored in a 3–1 loss to Zambia. He broke the record the following year against Paraguay and scored one more goal before retiring from football in 2013 at the age of 35. At the time of his retirement, he was South Africa's fourth most-capped player. Of McCarthy's 31 international goals, 15 were scored in friendlies – including 2 at the HKSAR Reunification Cup and 1 at U.S. Cup – 7 at the African Cup of Nations, 4 during African Cup of Nations qualifying, 3 in World Cup qualifying and a further 2 at the World Cup finals.

International goals
 South Africa score listed first, score column indicates score after each McCarthy goal.

See also
List of South Africa national football team hat-tricks
List of top international association football goal scorers by country
South African national football team records

References

Soccer in South Africa lists
Mccarthy
South Africa national soccer team